Mark Sinclair is an American actor better known as Vin Diesel.

Mark Sinclair may also refer to:

People
Mark Sinclair, 2010 Auckland local elections

Fictional characters
Mark Sinclair, character in The Alligator People
Mark Sinclair, character in Enter Inspector Duval